Quinn is an unincorporated community in Putnam County, in the U.S. state of Missouri.

History
A post office called Quinn was established in 1890, and remained in operation until 1905. The post office was maintained inside the house of a private citizen.

References

Unincorporated communities in Putnam County, Missouri
Unincorporated communities in Missouri